Silene fruticosa is a species of perennial herb in the family Caryophyllaceae (carpetweeds). They have a self-supporting growth form. Individuals can grow to 0.2 m.

Sources

References 

fruticosa
Flora of Malta